Hugh George Cholmondeley, 5th Baron Delamere (born 18 January 1934), styled The Honourable Hugh George Cholmondeley from birth until 1979, is a British peer. He is a well-known figure in the evolution and development of post-colonial Kenya. He was educated at Magdalene College, Cambridge. He owns the vast Soysambu Ranch in Kenya.

Personal life 
Lord Delamere was the eldest son of Thomas Cholmondeley, 4th Baron Delamere, whom he succeeded as baron in 1979. His mother was Phyllis Anne Montagu Douglas Scott, granddaughter of both the 6th Duke of Buccleuch and the 7th Duke of Rutland. Hugh Delamere (as he is known to family and friends) is an indirect descendant of Sir Robert Walpole, the first Prime Minister of Great Britain. He was educated at Eton, and then went up to Magdalene College, Cambridge. Graduating with a BA in 1955, he advanced to MA in 1959.

On 11 April 1964, Cholmondeley married Anne, daughter of Sir Patrick Muir Renison, the former Governor of Kenya. The couple had one son: Hon. Thomas Cholmondeley (usually known simply as Tom; 19 January 1968 – 17 August 2016).

Lands and estates
In this period, the Cholmondeley family continued to own land in Cheshire, and to have other holdings in the country; but the former baronial seat of Vale Royal Abbey was sold in 1947. He inherited the title from his father on 13 April 1979. The Delamere title and the branch of the Cholmondeley family were originally from Cheshire, so in 1987 he was asked to become a JP.

Lord Delamere has lived, worked and invested most of his life in building the modern state of Kenya. As of 2003 he continued to live on and own the vast estates at Sugoni Farm, Soysambu, Elmenteita, Kenya.

Notes

References
 Debrett, John, Charles Kidd, David Williamson. (1990). Debrett's Peerage and Baronetage. New York: Macmillan. 
 Hayden, Joseph. (1851). The book of dignities: containing rolls of the official personages of the British Empire. London: Longmans, Brown, Green, and Longmans. 
 Holland, G. D. et al. (1977). Vale Royal Abbey and House. Winsford, Cheshire: Winsford Local History Society. 
 Wright, Rupert "The Kennedys of Kenya," The Spectator (London). 11 April 1998.

1934 births
People educated at Eton College
Alumni of Magdalene College, Cambridge
Barons in the Peerage of the United Kingdom
Living people
Hugh
Hugh
British emigrants to Kenya
White Kenyan people
Eldest sons of British hereditary barons
Delamere